Frank James Ney (May 12, 1918 – November 24, 1992) was a mayor of Nanaimo, British Columbia, Canada, serving for twenty-one years. Ney also served a term as a member of the Legislative Assembly of British Columbia.  He was known for his outgoing personality, his habit of attending civic events and dressing up like a pirate for the appearances, and playing a central role in initiating the bathtub races across Georgia Strait from Nanaimo to Vancouver. He was an active skier, swimmer, figure skater and boater.   During the 1950/1951 season he was President of the Nanaimo Figure Skating Club.

He also, while Mayor, initiated the creation of cut-away corners of sidewalk curbs in downtown Nanaimo after spending one day in a wheelchair in order to experience for himself the difficulties in getting around experienced by those in wheelchairs.

Biography 
Born in London, England, Ney served in the RAF and RCAF as a pilot during World War II.  He was a resident of Nanaimo from 1946 until his death in 1992. He was Mayor of Nanaimo from 1968 to 1984, and 1987 to 1990 (defeated by Joy Leach), and a Social Credit Member of the Legislative Assembly for Nanaimo from 1969 to 1972.

Ney was also a member of the Society of Notaries Public of British Columbia from January 1956, until his death in November 1992, and had a very busy notarial practice in Nanaimo.  He was president of the Society from 1968-1969.

Ney, with his brother Bill, formed the Great National Land and Investment Corporation in 1964, was involved in real estate (as president of Nanaimo Realty Ltd.), and promoted the economic development of Vancouver Island.  He is perhaps most famous for the purchase and subdivision of Protection Island in 1960 and selling it under a pirate-promotion theme.

He participated in many local and provincial associations, and was Chairman of the Nanaimo Centennial Committee (1967), responsible for organizing the inaugural Great Bathtub Race between Nanaimo and Vancouver.  He was the first Chairman and Admiral of the Loyal Nanaimo Bathtub Society, established in 1968 to continue the bathtub race as an annual event.  Ney was made Freeman of the City of Nanaimo in 1984.

A bronze statue of Ney is sited at Swy-a-Lana Lagoon in downtown Nanaimo.

An extensive archive relating to Ney's personal and professional life are held in the Frank. J. Ney fonds at the Nanaimo Community Archives.

A biography about Frank Ney, based mainly on collected remembrance and stories about Ney, was published by Paul Gogo in 1995 (Frank Ney: A Canadian Legend).

A satirical musical review built around Ney's "Pirate Frank" persona premiered at Nanaimo's Western Edge Theatre in March 2007.

A play about him, Being Frank by writer G. Kim Blank, was performed at the Port Theatre in Nanaimo in April 2007, produced by TheatreOne and directed by Burton Lancaster; there is also a book by Blank based on the play entitled Being Frank, from which the following portrayal of Ney's character is given in the Preface:

" . . .  you watch Frank, but you don’t necessarily understand Frank, or even keep up with him. .  .  . what is immediately apparent is how many people will go on record to say they were "good friends" of Frank, though no one on the planet could have that many 'good friends.' But the effect he had on people, the way he moved around, his outward nature, his ability to be everywhere and always visible, the twinkle in his eye and the blarney of his gesture—all of this must have made him feel like everyone’s friend.  Yet, despite this—and here is where his wonderfully maddening complexity sets in—those closest to him inevitably said something much more intriguing: they didn’t really know him; they didn’t really know what moved him forward and what made him tick, what got him going in the morning and kept him up at night."

Frank Ney also appears as a character in Season One Episode 18 of the television series Bones, by name and his Pirate Mayor personality.

References

1918 births
1992 deaths
English emigrants to Canada
Mayors of Nanaimo
British Columbia Social Credit Party MLAs